Scheme 48 is a programming language, a dialect of the language Scheme, an implementation using an interpreter which emits bytecode. It has a foreign function interface for calling functions from the language C and comes with a library for regular expressions (regex), and an interface for Portable Operating System Interface (POSIX). It is supported by the portable Scheme library SLIB, and is the basis for the Scheme shell Scsh. It has been used in academic research. It is free and open-source software released under a BSD license.

It is called "Scheme 48" because the first version was written in 48 hours in August 1986. The authors now say it is intended to be understood in 48 hours.

Implementation

Scheme 48 uses a virtual machine to interpret the bytecode, which is written in a restricted dialect of Scheme called PreScheme, which can be translated to C and compiled to a native binary. PreScheme, or Pre-Scheme, is a statically-typed dialect of Scheme with the efficiency and low-level machine access of C while retaining many of the desirable features of Scheme.

References

External links
 

Scheme (programming language) interpreters
Scheme (programming language) implementations
Software using the BSD license